Élaine Michaud (born October 17, 1985) is a Canadian politician, who was elected to the House of Commons of Canada in the 2011 election. She represented the electoral district of Portneuf—Jacques-Cartier as a member of the New Democratic Party.

At the time of her election, she was a communications officer at the Régie de l'assurance maladie du Québec and a masters student at the École nationale d'administration publique.

Michaud won with 42.7% of the vote, defeating incumbent independent MP André Arthur by a margin of 7,793 votes. After the election, Arthur insulted her, saying he did not know what he could have said to people in his riding to avoid being beaten by a "fat girl with unclean teeth." Michaud responded saying that the comments reflected Arthur's "well-known pettiness" and stating she intended to "do politics differently."

Among Michaud's issues in the 41st Parliament were the issue of contaminated water in Shannon, Quebec, near the Valcartier military base in her riding and public opposition to the construction of Neuville Airport.

During the 41st Parliament, Michaud served as a member of the House Committees on Environment and Sustainable Development and  Official Languages, and an associate member of the Committees on Finance, National Defence, and Veterans Affairs.

In the 2012 NDP leadership race following the death of Jack Layton, Michaud supported Peggy Nash.

Michaud was defeated in the 2015 election by Conservative Joël Godin.

Following her defeat, Michaud stood for the presidency of the NDP after criticizing the leadership of Thomas Mulcair. Michaud was defeated by Toronto District School Board trustee Marit Stiles.

References

External links
 

Members of the House of Commons of Canada from Quebec
New Democratic Party MPs
Women members of the House of Commons of Canada
Living people
1985 births
People from Longueuil
21st-century Canadian politicians
21st-century Canadian women politicians
Université Laval alumni